Victoria Park Avenue is a major north-south route in eastern Toronto, Ontario, Canada. It is the western border of Scarborough, separating it from Old Toronto, East York, and North York. The common nickname for it is VP or Vic Park.

History

Victoria Park Avenue was originally a pioneer road for settlement of Scarborough. Except for its very southernmost section (south of Bracken Avenue), the road once formed the boundary for the former township, borough, and city of Scarborough with the former municipalities of East York, North York, and the former city of Toronto. Road was also called. Scarborough-York Town Line.

Route description
Victoria Park Avenue begins as a two-lane residential street near Lake Ontario at Queen Street at the east end of The Beaches community.  It takes a sharp jog west just before Bracken Avenue, and then continues in a straight line northward.

It remains a two-lane residential street past Bracken Avenue north to Gerrard Street, albeit one with a heavy traffic load; at Gerrard Street it becomes a four-lane major arterial road. It reduces to two lanes again from a point north of Danforth Avenue to Dawes Road, then returns to four lanes for rest of its length. North of Dawes it shifts from being a residential street to being a suburban arterial, with mostly stores and low rise apartment buildings along the rest of its length. North of McNicoll Avenue the route is a mixed commercial and light industrial street.

Victoria Park Avenue ends a short distance north of Steeles Avenue at Denison Street in Markham, Ontario.

Public transit
Victoria Park remains one of the busiest north-south streets in Scarborough, along with Markham Road and Kennedy Road. It is served by the Toronto subway at Victoria Park station. 

Historically the first bus to service the street were private routes that operated along Dawes Road, and then north along Victoria Park. This route was taken over by the TTC in 1954, and offered service as far north as Victoria Park and Lawrence. The opening of Victoria Park subway station in 1968 led to the creation of the 24 Victoria Park, replacing the Dawes Road bus on Victoria Park. It first ran to Victoria Park and Old Sheppard Avenue, but has steadily been extended northwards. With the opening of Sheppard subway in 2002, the 224 Victoria Park North ran from Don Mills station into Markham. The 224 went back to the older alignment with the 24D Victoria Park branch in 2016, then was replaced by the 24 Woodbine bus operated by York Region Transit later in 2016.

Also beginning in 1968, the portion of Victoria Park south of Victoria Park station began to be served by the 12 Kingston Road bus. This bus travels south of the station until Kingston Road and then turns east along Kingston to travel into Scarborough. It stops at Bingham Loop to meet up with the termini of the 503 Kingston Rd.

Landmarks

See also
 Royal eponyms in Canada

External links
 Victoria Park Avenue at Google Maps

References

Roads in Toronto